Oliver Burian (born 18 May 2001) is a Slovak footballer who plays as a left back.

Club career
Burian made his professional Fortuna Liga debut for Spartak Trnava against FC DAC 1904 Dunajská Streda on 21 June 2020.

References

External links
 FC Spartak Trnava official club profile 
 Futbalnet profile 
 
 

2001 births
Living people
Slovak footballers
Association football defenders
FC Spartak Trnava players
Slovak Super Liga players